Zigi Ben-Haim (born 1945 in Baghdad, Iraq) is an American-Israeli painter and sculptor who lives and works in New York City and Israel.

Current Projects

Why Flowers? 
"CoronaTime has accentuated our existence between life and death.

One object represents both ends.

Whether we’re going through bad times or good times we receive-Flowers!"

Past projects

On August 9, 2017, Ben-Haim unveiled his sculpture, Treasure the Green, in SoHo on Broadway. The project was sponsored by the SoHo Broadway Initiative and the New York Department of Transportation's Art Program. The sculpture is considered to be the first sculpture to receive permission to be installed on a bus bulb on Broadway. The sculpture was made to "emphasize the importance of nature in our lives," and stands as a reminder of "the importance of reconnecting with the pure nature of the green." The sculpture uses the symbol of the leaf, which has been a major icon of Ben-Haim's work for the past 30 years. It symbolizes nature and it is a metaphoric way of emphasizing nature and the surrounding environment.

Education 
1972-74        M.F.A., San Francisco State University, San Francisco, California, USA.

1972-73        M.A., J.F.K. University, Orinda, California, USA.

1971             California College of Arts & Crafts, Oakland, California, USA.

1966-70        The Avni Institute of Fine Arts, Tel Aviv, Israel.

Selected public collections
 
Museum of Contemporary Art, Athens, Greece
Columbia Museum of Art, Columbia, SC
Israel Air Force Center Foundation, Tel Aviv, Israel
NASA, Houston, Texas
Bank Leumi USA, Fifth Avenue, New York, NY
Pfizer Company Collection, New York, NY
Reading Public Museum, Reading, PA
Guggenheim Museum, New York, NY
Haifa Museum, Haifa, Israel
Herbert F. Johnson Museum of Art, Cornell University, Ithaca, NY
New School, New York, NY
University of Maryland, College Park, Maryland.
Israel Museum, Jerusalem, Israel.
Brooklyn Museum, Brooklyn, NY
Malmö Museum, Malmö, Sweden.
Jewish Museum, New York, NY
Tel Aviv Museum of Art, Tel Aviv, Israel.
Museum of Fine Arts, Ghent, Ghent, Belgium.
National Gallery of Art, Washington D.C.
Fine Arts Museum of Long Island, Hempstead, NY
Buscaglia-Castellanni, University Museum, Lewiston, NY
Dan Eilat Hotel, Israel.
International Paper Company, New York, NY
World Bank, Washington D.C.
Davis Polk & Wordwell, New York, NY
Westminster Bank, New York, NY
Israel Embassy, Washington D.C.
Frederick R. Weisman, Los Angeles, CA.
Rikers Hill Sculpture Park, Livingston, NJ
Heckscher Museum of Art, Huntington, NY
Allen Memorial Art Museum, Oberlin College, Oberlin, Ohio

See also

Israeli art
Israeli sculpture

References

External links

 Zigi Ben-Haim's website
 Grant recipient profile at the America-Israel Cultural Foundation
 Galerie Rother Winter
 Stux Gallery
 Chelouche Gallery

1945 births
American people of Iraqi-Jewish descent
Iraqi Jews
Iraqi painters
Iraqi sculptors
Jewish Israeli artists
Israeli male painters
Jewish painters
Jewish American artists
Living people
21st-century American Jews